History of Britain may refer to:
History of the British Isles, including the history of Great Britain, Ireland and its components
History of the United Kingdom (1707 to present)
History of Britain (Milton), a prose work by the English poet John Milton
A History of the English-Speaking Peoples, 1956–58 four-volume work by Winston Churchill
A History of Britain (TV series), a documentary series written and presented by Simon Schama
A History of Britain (book), the accompanying book
The History of Great Britain (Hume) history of Britain in six volumes written by David Hume

See also 

 History of England (disambiguation)